Xanthoparmelia neowyomingica is a rock shield lichen which belongs to the Xanthoparmelia genus. The lichen is uncommon and is listed as endangered by the Nature Conservatory.

Description 
Grows on soil with firm lobes that are 3–4 cm in diameter and yellowish green in color. Lobes are approximately 0.8–2 mm wide and are convoluted and branched at the tips. Moderately to densely packed pale brown rhizines on the underside that are 0.5-1.0mm long.

Habitat and range 
Found in the North American southwest including the US states of Montana, Colorado, and Wyoming

See also 

 List of Xanthoparmelia species

References 

neowyomingica
Lichen species
Lichens of North America